A Walkin' Thing is the final studio album by organist Shirley Scott recorded in 1992 at Van Gelder Studio and released on the Candid label.

Reception
The Allmusic site awarded the album 4 stars stating "One of Shirley Scott's last viable recordings before she passed away is a sweet, delicious collection of jazz standards and originals with a fresh-faced group that the organist was happy she was able to present, if the music is any indication... On this solid top-to-bottom recording, and one of her better contemporary efforts, Shirley Scott carries on fine and mellow, emphasizing her strengths and letting her very capable band do the work while she lingers in her own serene, soulful way".

Track listing 
 "Carnival (Panamanian Independence Song)" (Traditional) - 4:07    
 "D.T. Blues" (Terell Stafford) - 6:06    
 "A Walkin' Thing" (Benny Carter) - 10:43    
 "When a Man Loves a Woman" (Calvin Lewis, Andrew Wright) - 3:51    
 "What Makes Harold Sing?" (Shirley Scott) - 4:12    
 "Shades of Bu" (Tim Warfield) - 6:51    
 "How Am I to Know?" (Jack King, Dorothy Parker) - 8:36    
 "Remember" (Irving Berlin) - 9:09

Personnel 
 Shirley Scott - organ
 Terell Stafford - trumpet
 Tim Warfield - tenor saxophone
 Arthur Harper - bass 
 Aaron Walker  - drums

References 

1992 albums
Candid Records albums
Shirley Scott albums
Albums recorded at Van Gelder Studio